Vice Admiral John Charles O'Brien OC, CD (16 December 1918 – 24 March 1996) was a Canadian Forces officer who served as Commander Maritime Command from 19 July 1966 to 6 July 1970.

Career
O'Brien joined the Royal Canadian Navy in 1935. He was in action off Norway in 1939, commanded a small boat at the Dunkirk evacuation in 1940, served as a Signals Officer for the Allied invasion of Sicily in 1943 during the Second World War. He became Director Naval Training in 1955, Director Naval Communications in 1957 and Commanding Officer of the aircraft carrier  in 1959. He went on to be Naval Member of the Canadian Joint Staff in Washington, D.C. in 1961, Senior Canadian Officer Afloat (Atlantic) in 1964 and Commander Maritime Command in 1966. His last appointment was as Commandant of the NATO Defense College in Rome in 1970 before retiring in 1973.

O'Brien married Stephanie Frances Swire; she died on 2 October 2006.

Awards and decorations
Obrien's personal awards and decorations include the following:

References

Canadian admirals
Royal Canadian Navy officers
Officers of the Order of Canada
1918 births
1996 deaths
Commanders of the Royal Canadian Navy
Royal Canadian Navy personnel of World War II
British emigrants to Canada
Military personnel from Sussex